is a Japanese actress and pop singer, from Himeji, Hyogo, Japan.

Career

2000–2009: Hello! Project
Aya auditioned in 2000 for the fourth Morning Musume & Heike Michiyo Protegee Audition and was selected along with Sheki-Dol to become a part of what was later known as Hello! Project. After being chosen from that audition, Matsuura began her solo career. In time, she would become one of Hello! Project's biggest acts.

Aside from a successful solo career, Matsuura (nicknamed Ayaya), also did numerous collaborations with other members of Hello! Project, including special, usually short lived groups Gomattou with Maki Goto and Miki Fujimoto; Nochiura Natsumi with Maki Goto and Natsumi Abe; and DEF.DIVA with Maki Goto, Natsumi Abe, and Rika Ishikawa. She also did the "Folk Song" series which feature Yuko Nakazawa and other Hello! Project artists, as well as Hello! Project's shuffle groups (3nin Matsuri in 2001, Odoru 11 in 2002, Salt5 in 2003, and the larger H.P. All Stars in 2004).

She also formed the duo GAM with Miki Fujimoto in debuted September 2006. Their first single, "Thanks!" reached the #2 position on the Oricon.

Matsuura starred in the Japanese film Sukeban Deka: Codename = Asamiya Saki (known internationally as Yo-Yo Girl Cop) opposite Rika Ishikawa, released on September 30, 2006.

On October 9, 2006 both concerts she was supposed to hold that day were cancelled, as she was not feeling well.
Soon several unsourced rumours emerged considering the possibility she might be suffering from Temporomandibular joint disorder.  Following the cancellation of the two concerts, Matsuura's management confirmed the rumours, reported the young idol had been taking painkillers to continue working and scheduled a press conference to discuss her condition. On the following day Matsuura made a public statement on PBS apologizing to her fans and expressing her desire to get back to her singing career as soon as possible.

Since her press conference, Matsuura returned to her normal hosting duties on her weekly radio show, "Matsuura Aya no All Night Nippon" and returned to singing in a limited capacity, as demonstrated on her appearance on Hey! Hey! Hey! Music Champ on October 23, 2006.

On March 8, 2008, Matsuura—as a secret guest—performed at the opening ceremony of the Fourth Special Olympics Japan Winter National Games, a national event in preparation of the 2009 Special Olympics World Winter Games held in Boise, Idaho. She performed the song "Kizuna", which was released on May 21, 2008 as her 20th single.

2008–2013: Graduation and Reshuffle
It was officially announced on October 19, 2008 that Matsuura would be graduating from Hello! Project along with the rest of Elder Club. Before her graduation, Matsuura released her fifth studio album, Omoi Afurete, on January 21, 2009, and her 21st single, "Chocolate Damashii", was released on February 11 for Valentine's Day.

Matsuura graduated from Hello! Project on March 31, 2009, but months later, on August 26, 2009, Matsuura launched her own blog called Ayablog and announced that her Omoi Afurete  tour will be her last for two or three years. However, she has since released a Cover Album (Click You, Link Me, 2010). In late August 2011, it was revealed that she is diagnosed with endometriosis, which has been and will continue to limit her concert activities in the future. However, from 2009 to 2013, She has consistently released Acoustic Concerts, known as "Aya Matsuura's Maniac Series". She was signed to UpFront Create, along with some of the members of the Hello Project! Elder Club. At the end of the year, she performed along with all other Hello Project members at the concert "Hello! Project COUNTDOWN PARTY 2013 ~GOOD BYE & HELLO!~" where she announced her indefinite hiatus.

2022: Return to Entertainment
On January 27, Matsuura was a guest on the podcast 'Matthew's Matthew', thus marking the end of an almost decade long hiatus. On April 14, Matsuura was featured in a commercial for Nescafe 'Excella' coffee. On August 9, Keita Tachibana announced on Twitter that a new single 'Addicted' would be released on November 25.

Other appearances
Matsuura has appeared in many commercials for various companies; notably Pretz snack foods, Epson color printers, and Kirin beverages. She has also taken part and co-hosts the television show Utawara with other names in Japanese entertainment such as Johnny Jimusho's Jun Matsumoto.

Personal life
Matsuura and Keita Tachibana registered their marriage on August 4, 2013, after almost 12 years of dating. They held their wedding ceremony in Hawaii on October 7. On December 21, 2014, the couple announced the birth of their first child, a baby girl.

Discography and releases

Studio albums

Cover albums

Compilations

Singles 

† A cover of Chisato Moritaka's 1993 original. The bridge in the title is one of twelve bridges that cross the Watarase River in the city of Ashikaga.

†† Last release within Hello! Project, as she graduated soon after its release.

DVDs

Videos
 2001-04-25 – 
 2001-06-27 – 
 2001-09-05 – 
 2001-12-12 – 
 2002-08-07 – 
 2002-10-09 – 
 2003-02-19 – 
 2003-02-26 – 
 2003-03-12 –

Photobooks
Solo photobooks
 2001-12-01 – 
 2003-02-14 – 
 2004-01-15 – 
 2004-06-25 – 
 2005-03-19 – a

Concert photobooks
 2002-06-04 – 
 2004-07-07 – 

Other photobooks
 2003-04-11 – 
 2003-09-30 – Matsuura Aya in Hello! Project 2003 Summer
 2004-03-13 – Matsuura Aya in Hello! Project 2004 Winter
 2004-09-28 – Matsuura Aya in Hello! Project 2004 Summer
 2005-07-06 –

Acts

Television variety shows

TV drama

Films
 Ao no Honō (2003)
 Sukeban Deka: Codename = Asamiya Saki'' (2006)

Radio
  – JOLF, etc. (April, 2001—2005-03-27)
  – JOLF and other thirty-five radio stations in Japan (2005-03-30 — 2006-12-27)
 Matsuura Aya FIVE STARS– InterFM 76.1 (TUESDAY 松浦亜弥) (Start date 2007-10-02)October 2007-September 2009 (End date 2009-09-29)

Commercials
 Pretz (2002–2006, Ezaki Glico)
 Tessera (2002–2004, Shiseido)
 Gogo no Kocha (2003–2008, Kirin Beverage)
 Colorio Printer (2003–2005, Epson)
 Sega PuyoPuyo Fever (2004)
 Papico (2004–2006, Ezaki Glico)
 Pocky (2004–2005, Ezaki Glico)
 Sky PerfecTV! (2004–2005, SKY Perfect Communications)
 Super Mild (2004–2005, Shiseido)
 Scooter Let's 4 (2004–2005, Suzuki)
 Nissin Yakisoba UFO (2005–2006, Nissin)
 Aoyama Trading (Youfuku Aoyama) (2005–2008)
 Youpack (2005–2006, Japan Post)
 Scooter Address V50 (2006, Suzuki)
 Expressway ETC (2007, Organization for Road System Enhancement) -- song only
 Center-in (2007, Unicharm)
 Fried Chicken (2008, FamilyMart) -- also the song "Kichin to Chicken" lyrics and music by Fujioka Fujimaki, a folk song duo.
 Mezamashi Gohan (2009, MAFF)
 Top "Clear Liquid" (since 2009, Lion)
 Vitamin Water (since 2009, Suntory)
 Roots Aroma Impact (since 2010, JT Foods), etc.

Video games
 Guitar Freaks 8th mix / Drummania 7th mix (Momoiro Kataomoi, covered by Yu Uchida)
 Donkey Konga (Japanese version, Momoiro Kataomoi covered by an unknown artist)
 Daigasso! Band Brothers (Yeah! Meccha Holiday, instrumental)
 Go-Go-Tea Miniature Golf (Kirin Beverage)
 Donkey Konga 2 (Japanese Version, Yeah! Meccha Holiday)

References

External links

 Official profile at the Up-Front Works 
 

1986 births
Living people
People from Himeji, Hyōgo
Japanese actresses
Japanese idols
Japanese women pop singers
Hello! Project solo singers
Def.Diva members
GAM (group) members
Salt5 members
Musicians from Hyōgo Prefecture
Japanese synth-pop singers
Japanese dance music singers